Bohdanivka is a village in Boryspil Raion in the east of Kyiv Oblast, Ukraine. It belongs to Yahotyn urban hromada, one of the hromadas of Ukraine. 

Local government is administered by Bohdanivska village council. It comprises villages Bohdanivka and Koptevychivka.

Geography 

History  
Bogdanovka village was founded in 1730.

Until 18 July 2020, Bohdanivka belonged to Yahotyn Raion. The raion was abolished that day as part of the administrative reform of Ukraine, which reduced the number of raions of Kyiv Oblast to seven. The area of Yahotyn Raion was merged into Boryspil Raion.Occupied by Germans in 1917-8 and 1941-3.

Famous people 
 Kateryna Vasylivna Bilokur – a Ukrainian folk artist, the People's Artist of Ukraine.

References

External links 
 weather.in.ua/Bohdanivka (Kyiv region).

Villages in Boryspil Raion
Piryatinsky Uyezd